Paul James Reid (born 6 July 1979) is an Australian international footballer who is an assistant coach for Sydney FC in the A-league.

Reid previously played for Wollongong Wolves during championship winning seasons before moving to England where he played for six years with Bradford City and Brighton & Hove Albion before returning to Australia.

Reid has made two appearances for the Australian national team.

Early life
Born in Sydney, Australia, Reid started his youth career at Marconi Stallions alongside Socceroos, Harry Kewell and Brett Emerton in the same U-13 team and was quickly noted for his talents.

Club career
Reid went on to begin his senior football career in Australia for Wollongong Wolves in 1998. He became a cult hero during his time at the Wollongong Wolves after scoring the last minute equaliser in the 2000 grand final against Perth Glory. The Wolves went on to win the game 7–6 on penalties. In 2002, Reid moved to England and joined Bradford City, but only stayed for one season before joining Brighton & Hove Albion in 2003.

Reid had usually played in the right-back position in defence for the Seagulls, but the player has stated his preferred position is in the centre of midfield. Near the start of the 2006–07 season, Reid suffered a serious knee injury which saw him sidelined for nearly a year, but the player did return for the start of the 2007–08 pre-season. On 6 May 2008, it was confirmed that Reid, along with experienced trio Kerry Mayo, Gary Hart and Guy Butters were to be released from the club. On 11 July 2008, Reid began training with Hereford United in a bid to win a new contract.

Adelaide United
He was expected to sign with Perth Glory for the 2008–09 A-League season, but instead signed with Adelaide United on a two-year deal. He won a call up to the national-team squad in October 2008 along with Adelaide United teammates Scott Jamieson, Robert Cornthwaite and Eugene Galeković. Despite usually playing in a deep midfield role Reid has created a number of assists from both open play and set pieces. He scored his first goal for the club in a 1–1 draw against Wellington Phoenix at Westpac Stadium on 18 January 2009.

Melbourne Heart
Reid signed a short-term end of season contract with Melbourne Heart as injury cover during the 2012 January transfer window.

INSEE Police United

On 9 March, Reid agreed with a short-term contract with INSEE Police United. He arrived in Thailand on 11 March.

Sydney FC

In early 2011, Reid had asked former club Adelaide United for a release to join hometown club Sydney FC for their 2011 Asian Champions League campaign, resulting in a bitter fallout between himself and then manager Rini Coolen who would not release him until season's end. In September 2012, it was announced that Reid was on trial with Sydney FC, taking part in two of their pre-season matches against A-League opposition before eventually signing a 1-year deal to join the Sky Blues beginning on 1 October 2012. However, as a result of Sydney FC failing to qualify for the A-League finals, Reid, along with teammates Nathan Sherlock, Krunoslav Lovrek, Trent McClenahan, Adam Griffiths and Jarrod Kyle were released by Sydney FC at the conclusion of the 2012-13 A-League season.

Rockdale City Suns
After being released as a player from Sydney FC, Reid signed for Rockdale City Suns in the NSW Premier League. However, he also still works for Sydney FC as a Community Football Officer.

International career
Reid made his senior international debut for the Socceroos on 28 January 2009 in an AFC Asian Cup qualifying match versus Indonesia.

Coaching career
Following Branko Culina departure from the managers position at Rockdale, following a poor start to the 2015 NPL, Reid was announced as Rockdale City Suns new coach, a position which he would combine with playing duty when required. Reid led Rockdale to the Round of 16 of the 2015 FFA Cup against A-League club Melbourne Victory at Jubilee Oval. Despite a valiant comeback, Melbourne would win 3-2 and go on to win the overall competition.

Career statistics

Honours

Club
Wollongong Wolves
NSL Championship: 1999–2000, 2000–01
Oceania Club Championship: 2000–01

References

External links
Adelaide United profile
OzFootball profile

1979 births
Living people
Sportsmen from New South Wales
Soccer players from Sydney
Association football midfielders
Expatriate footballers in Thailand
Australian expatriate soccer players
Australia international soccer players
Australian expatriate sportspeople in England
A-League Men players
National Soccer League (Australia) players
English Football League players
Macarthur Rams FC players
Adelaide United FC players
Melbourne City FC players
Bradford City A.F.C. players
Brighton & Hove Albion F.C. players
Wollongong Wolves FC players
Paul Reid
Sydney FC players
Rockdale Ilinden FC players
National Premier Leagues players
Australian soccer players